AOTGL may refer to:

 Attack of the Giant Leeches, a 1959 science fiction-horror film
 Attack of the Grey Lantern, a 1997 album by Mansun